Khalat Pushan (also Romanized as Khal‘at Pūshān and Khal‘at Pooshan) is a village in Karchambu-e Jonubi Rural District, in the Central District of Buin va Miandasht County, Isfahan Province, Iran. At the 2006 census, its population was 73, in 17 families.

References 

Populated places in Buin va Miandasht County